North Melbourne railway station is the junction for the Craigieburn, Flemington Racecourse, Sunbury, Upfield, Werribee and Williamstown lines in Victoria, Australia. It serves the inner-northern Melbourne suburb of West Melbourne, and opened on 6 October 1859.

Located on the northern edge of the Central Business District, the station is listed on the Victorian Heritage Register.

History
The first railway through the site of North Melbourne station was today's Williamstown line, and the first section of the Melbourne, Mount Alexander and Murray River Railway Company line (to Sunbury), which both opened on 13 January 1859. On 6 October 1859, the first passenger station, with two platforms, was opened, and on 9 June 1886, the present six-platform station opened.

The new station was of free classical architecture. Red brick was used, with cream brick banding, along with verandas and cast iron lace work. As built in 1886, North Melbourne had six platforms, with four platform buildings containing ladies' toilets and a ladies' waiting room. The main booking office, waiting room and station master's office were near the ramp to Platform 1, and the men's toilets and porters' offices were located under the ramps themselves.

In December 1973, the suburban train stabling yard to the north the station opened, as part of the City Loop project. The footbridge that links the sidings with the Macaulay maintenance centre was also provided around that time. In 1974, the station buildings on the northern concourse were provided and, in the 1980s, as part of the construction works for the City Loop, the ramps to Platforms 1 and 2 were altered, and the platform extended at the down end.

In May 1995, a washing plant and additional sidings in Melbourne Yard, located to the west of the station, were provided, as part of the Jolimont Yard rationalisation. On 19 July 1996, North Melbourne was upgraded to a Premium Station.

In May 2006, it was announced that the station was to be redeveloped as part of a $36 million project. Work included a new main entrance at the up (southern) end of the station, with escalators, stairs and lifts installed for quicker access to other platforms and to cater for disabled passengers. Work started in May 2007, and was completed on 16 November 2009. To aid construction and avoid disruption to train passengers, a crash deck was erected over the tracks, to allow trains to run normally underneath while building work continued overhead.

In March 2008, bus route 401 began operating from North Melbourne to the Royal Melbourne Hospital and University of Melbourne in Carlton and Parkville, removing the need for passengers to those destinations to travel via the City Loop.

After December 2013, V/Line Geelong and Warrnambool services no longer stopped at the station, due to the opening of the first section of the Regional Rail Link (RRL) between Southern Cross and South Kensington. The line runs to the west of North Melbourne, but no platforms were provided. On 11 July 2014, Ballarat, Ararat, Bendigo, Swan Hill and Echuca line services also ceased stopping at North Melbourne, having moved to the RRL tracks.

In November 2017, the Victorian State Government announced that, as part of the Metro Tunnel project, North Melbourne would be renamed West Melbourne, to better reflect its geographical location, and to allow a nearby new station to be named North Melbourne. The name change plan was later abandoned.

Platforms, facilities and services
North Melbourne has six platforms: two side platforms and two island platforms with four faces. The main station entrance is at the southern end of the platforms, at the intersection of Adderley and Dryburgh Streets. The station building contains the main booking office, public toilets and a kiosk, with platform access via escalators and lifts. At the north end, the original asphalt ramps link all six platforms, with Platforms 2 through to 6 having heritage-listed verandas and brick waiting rooms.

At the north end of the station are 1970s-era brown brick buildings, built over the former Dynon Road overpass, which contain public toilets and the former railway parcels office. Until November 2009, the building was also the main exit to Ireland Street and Railway Place, and contained the booking office and a kiosk, until those facilities were moved to the new concourse at the south end. The north end also has an exit leading west to the Melbourne Yard rail freight terminal, which is not open to public access.

North Melbourne is served by Craigieburn, Sunbury, Upfield, Werribee and Williamstown line trains, as well as V/Line Seymour and Shepparton line services.

Platform 1:
  all stations services to Flinders Street
  all stations services to Flinders Street
  services to Southern Cross (special event days only)
  weekday V/Line services to Southern Cross (set down only)
  one weekday peak-hour V/Line service to Southern Cross (set down only)

Platform 2:
  all stations services to Craigieburn
  all stations services to Upfield
  express services to Showgrounds and/or Flemington Racecourse (special event days only)
  weekday V/Line services to Seymour (pick up only)
  one weekday peak-hour V/Line service to Shepparton (pick up only)

Platform 3:
  all stations services to Flinders Street
  weekday peak-hour V/Line services to Southern Cross (set down only)

Platform 4:
  all stations and limited express services to Watergardens and Sunbury

Platform 5:
  all stations services to Flinders Street
  all stations services to Flinders Street and Frankston
  all stations services to Flinders Street and Frankston
  all stations services to Flinders Street (special event days only)

Platform 6: 
  all stations services to Craigieburn
  all stations and limited express services to Laverton and Werribee
  all stations services to Williamstown
  express services to Showgrounds and/or Flemington Racecourse (special event days only)

Transport links
Transit Systems Victoria operates one bus route to and from North Melbourne station, under contract to Public Transport Victoria:
 : to University of Melbourne

Gallery

References

External links
 
 Melway map at street-directory.com.au

Heritage-listed buildings in Melbourne
Premium Melbourne railway stations
Railway stations in Melbourne
Railway stations in Australia opened in 1859
Railway stations in Australia opened in 1886
Listed railway stations in Australia
Railway stations in the City of Melbourne (LGA)